Us and Them is the second studio album by American rock band Shinedown, released on October 4, 2005. Recorded in Jacksonville, Florida and Sanford, Florida, the album had three singles, two of which, "Save Me" and "I Dare You," were used as themes for WWE pay-per-view events No Mercy 2005 and WrestleMania 22 respectively. On March 19, 2018 Us and Them was certified Platinum by the RIAA for selling 1 million units in the United States. Us and Them is the last album to feature guitarist Jasin Todd and bassist Brad Stewart.

Track listing

Additional songs
This song was featured on a separate CD that was sold bundled with the album at Best Buy for a limited time following the album's release.

This song was an exclusive download that could only be accessed with a code found exclusively in versions of the CD sold at Wal-Mart.

These songs were exclusive to the 2LP vinyl release on Atlantic Records

Additionally, an unreleased duet version of "Shed Some Light" featuring Lzzy Hale of Halestorm has surfaced online but has never been officially released.

Personnel
Band
 Brent Smith – lead vocals
 Jasin Todd – guitar
 Brad Stewart – bass
 Barry Kerch – drums

Additional personnel
 Paul Fleury – cello
 Juan Perez – maracas
 Olivia Battaglia – spoken word vocals on "The Dream"

Production
 Tony Battaglia - producer
 Tom Lord-Alge - mixing
 Ted Jensen - mastering

Chart positions

Album

Singles

Certifications

References

2005 albums
Atlantic Records albums
Shinedown albums